Second Yanukovych Government was a governing coalition of the Party of Regions, the Communist Party and the Socialist Party in Ukraine after the 2006 Ukrainian parliamentary election and the 2006 Ukrainian political crisis. Until 24 March 2007, it was known as Anti-Crisis Alliance.

History

Initially the Our Ukraine Bloc intended to join the coalition and five of its ministers were initially appointed into Cabinet of Ministers of the coalition; Justice Minister Roman Zvarych, Family and Sports Minister Yuriy Pavlenko, Emergency Situations Minister Viktor Baloha, Culture Minister Ihor Likhovyy, and Health Minister Yuriy Polyachenko. By November 2006 these five ministers were dismissed by parliament or withdrawn by Our Ukraine Bloc.

Before the crisis which sparked the 2007 parliamentary election, the coalition consisted of the following 249 members of parliamentary parties:
 Party of Regions (186)
 Socialist Party of Ukraine (31)
 Communist Party of Ukraine (21)
 Yulia Tymoshenko Electoral Bloc (6)
 Our Ukraine Bloc (5)

At its highest point the Alliance consisted of 260 members, and the trend was that opposition members were willing to join the Alliance, and thereby undermine the authority of the President and move towards the 300-member constitutional majority.

On 6 April 2007 the coalition's members count was reduced to 238 members:
 Party of Regions (186)
 Socialist Party of Ukraine (31)
 Communist Party of Ukraine (21)

Fall of cabinet
President of Ukraine Yushchenko dissolved parliament on 2 April 2007 because he believed the government was acting illegally during the 2007 Ukrainian political crisis. Yushchenko argued that the constitution only allows whole parliamentary blocs to change sides, not individuals deputies. Yushchenko, Yanukovych and parliamentary speaker Oleksandr Moroz agreed in late May 2007 that the election would be held on 30 September, provided that at least 150 opposition and pro-president MPs formally gave up their seats, thereby creating the legal grounds for dissolving parliament. This happened.

Creation

Composition
The Cabinet of Ministers of Ukraine of the Alliance of National Unity was appointed on August 4, 2006; it served until the twelfth Cabinet and Second Tymoshenko Government was chosen on December 18, 2007. Its composition was:

 Prime Minister — Viktor Yanukovych (Party of Regions)
 First Vice Prime Minister, Finance Minister — Mykola Azarov (Party of Regions)
 Vice Prime Minister in affairs of Building, Architecture and Housing and Communal Services — Volodymyr Rybak
 Vice Prime Minister — Andriy Klyuyev (Party of Regions)
 Vice Prime Minister — Dmytro Tabachnyk (Party of Regions)
 Vice Prime Minister — Viktor Slauta
 Vice Prime Minister — Volodymyr Radchenko (January 12 — May 25, 2007) replaced with Oleksandr Kuzmuk
 Minister of Internal Affairs — Vasyl Tsushko (Socialist Party of Ukraine)
 Minister for Foreign Affairs — Borys Tarasyuk (dismissed on December 1, 2006) replaced with Arseniy Yatsenyuk
 Minister of Coal Mining Industry — Serhiy Tulub (Party of Regions)
 Minister of Culture — Yuriy Bohutsky
 Minister of Defense — Anatoliy Hrytsenko
 Minister of Economy — Volodymyr Makukha replaced with Anatoliy Kinakh (Industrials and Entrepreneurs)
 Minister of Education and Science — Stanislav Nikolaenko
 Fuel and Energy Minister — Yuriy Boyko
 Minister of Labor and Social Policy — Mykhailo Papiev
 Health Minister — Yuriy Polyachenko
 Minister of Agro-Industrial Complex — Yuriy Melnyk (Ukrainian People's Party)
 Minister of Industrial Policy — Anatoliy Holovko
 Minister of Environmental Protection — Vasyl Dzharty
 Minister of Transport and Communications — Mykola Rudkovsky
 Minister of Emergencies — Nestor Shufrych
 Minister for Family, Youth and Sport — Viktor Korzh
 Minister of Justice — Oleksandr Lavrynovych
 Minister in connections with Verkhovna Rada and other state authorities — Ivan Tkalenko
 Minister of the Cabinet of Ministers — Anatoliy Tolstoukhov

References

External links
 Governmental Portal of Ukraine - official site of the Cabinet of Ministers

Ukrainian governments
2006 establishments in Ukraine
2007 disestablishments in Ukraine
Cabinets established in 2006
Cabinets disestablished in 2007
Viktor Yanukovych